Melese babosa is a moth of the family Erebidae. It was described by Paul Dognin in 1894. It is found in Brazil and Ecuador.

References

 Natural History Museum Lepidoptera generic names catalog

Melese
Moths described in 1894